Eucosma guentheri is a species of moth belonging to the family Tortricidae.

It is native to Subarctic Europe.

References

Eucosmini
Moths described in 1869